Finn Webjørn Tøraasen (1 June 1936 – 2 May 2018) was a Norwegian footballer who played as a left-back for Skeid from 1954 to 1964. He won the Norwegian Cup twice: 1958 and 1963. He played a total of 103 matches in the Norwegian Premier League, scoring 11 goals.

References

1936 births
2018 deaths
Footballers from Oslo
Norwegian footballers
Skeid Fotball players
Association football fullbacks